HMAS Adroit (P 82) was an  of the Royal Australian Navy (RAN).

Design and construction

The Attack class was ordered in 1964 to operate in Australian waters as patrol boats, based on lessons learned through using the s on patrols around Borneo during the Indonesia-Malaysia Confrontation, and to replace a variety of old patrol, search-and-rescue, and general-purpose craft. Initially, nine were ordered for the RAN, with another five for Papua New Guinea's Australian-run coastal security force, although another six ships were ordered to bring the class to twenty vessels. Their propulsion machinery consisted of two 16-cylinder Paxman YJCM diesel engines, which supplied  to the two propellers. The ship's company consisted of three officers and sixteen sailors. The main armament was a bow-mounted Bofors 40 mm gun, which was supplemented by two .50-calibre M2 Browning machine guns and various small arms. The ships were designed with as many commercial components as possible: the Attacks were to operate in remote regions of Australia and New Guinea, and a town's hardware store would be more accessible than home base in a mechanical emergency.

Adroit was laid down by Evans Deakin and Company at Brisbane, Queensland, in August 1967, launched on 3 February 1968 and commissioned on 17 August 1968.

Operational history
The patrol boat was transferred to the Fremantle Port Division of the Royal Australian Navy Reserve in March 1983.

Fate
Adroit paid off on 28 March 1992. The patrol boat was sunk as a target by A-4 Skyhawk aircraft of No. 2 Squadron RNZAF on 8 August 1994. The wreck is located in the Rottnest ship graveyard, west of Rottnest Island.

Citations

References

Attack-class patrol boats
Ships built in Queensland
1968 ships